The music of the former Netherlands Antilles is a mixture of native, African and European elements, and is closely connected with trends from neighboring countries such as Venezuela and Colombia and islands such as Puerto Rico, Cuba, Santo Domingo, Haiti, Martinique, Trinidad, Dominica, and Guadeloupe. The former Netherlands Antilles islands of Curaçao and Aruba are known for their typical waltzes, danzas, mazurkas and a kind of music called tumba, which is named after the conga drums that accompany it.

The remaining islands are much smaller than Aruba, Bonaire, and Curaçao. They are Sint Eustatius, Sint Maarten and Saba. Sint Eustatius has little nightlife, with only one nightclub (the zouk Largo Height Disco) as of 1996. The inhabitants, "Statians", hold impromptu street dances called "road blocks", using booming car stereos. Saba has a number of dances at various restaurants, including a wide variety of hip hop, calypso, soca, kompa, zouk, bouyon, reggae and merengue. Sint Maarten has a well-known Carnival tradition featuring music and dance, held in mid-April and culminating in the traditional burning of King Moui-Moui, as well as a number of nightclubs and casinos featuring music; popular "spots" where locals go to dance include Boo Boo Jam and Lago Height, both located on the northern (French) part of Sint Maarten; the most popular recent casino band is King Bo-Bo, known as the "King of Calypso".

Modern Aruban music 
Music is very closely connected to the Aruban culture, and plays a major role in holidays, carnivals and informal celebrations. Carnival music originated in Trinidad in the late 18th century, and combines romantic themes, calypso-inspired tunes, and drums from tumba. Other Aruban celebrations that are based around music include Dera Gai, Dande, Gaita and Aguinaldo.

Music of Curaçao

Traditional music on Bonaire 
The island of Bonaire is known for an array of dances, including the Bari and Simadan. Imported polka, carioca, rumba, merengue, danza, joropo, jazz waltz and mazurka are also popular. The Baile di Sinta is a popular fertility dance, performed around a maypole. Traditional African work songs on Bonaire evolved over time into ritual songs with complex dances, instrumentation and polyphony.

The Bari, performed during the festival of the same name, as well as at other times, is led by a single singer who improvises lyrics commenting on local events and figures (such a singer is similar to a calypsonian). Confusingly, the Bari dance, which is performed during the Bari festival, is accompanied by a bongo-like drum called a Bari. The first part of the dance features men competing in a stylized, ritual dance for women, followed by a part where the couples dance, though they don't touch (it is similar to tumba).

After the sorghum harvest in February through April, the Simadan festival is held to celebrate, with the wapa, a rhythmic, shuffling dance, accompanying the celebration. Simadan's traditional songs include three call-and-response forms, the Dan Simadan, Belua and Remailo.   These use instruments including the bari, wiri, karko, quarta, guitar, triangle and clapping.

Notes

References

Further reading 
 Jong, Nanette de. “An Anatomy of Creolization: Curaçao and the Antillean Waltz”. Latin American Music Review, Volume 24, Number 2, Fall/Winter. 2003, pp. 233–251.

External links 
 Aruban Music Carnaval in Aruba.

Dutch music
Music
Netherlands Antilles
Netherlands Antilles